Agujetas de color de rosa (English title: Pink shoe laces) is a Mexican telenovela produced by Luis de Llano Macedo for Televisa in 1994.

Natalia Esperón and Flavio César starred as protagonists, Angélica María, Alberto Vázquez and Pedro Armendáriz, Jr. starred as adult protagonists, while Gabriela Hassel and the leading actress María Teresa Rivas starred as antagonists.

Plot

Elisa has just become a widow and now she has to raise her 3 children: Paola, Daniel and Anita. Elvira, mother of the deceased Esteban wants to steal his inheritance and for it hires Julian Ledesma, a vile and ambitious lawyer who is in love with Paola, who wants to be a skater, since the ice rink inspires her and full of tranquility.

Gonzalo is a good man, but his wife has abandoned him and leaves him with his two children, Martín and Luisito, so now he must put all his effort and effort to prevent his family from falling apart. Martín dreams of being a great singer and signing a contract with a record company.

One day, Elisa collides with Gonzalo and despite the mishap, begins a beautiful friendship that will serve her in difficult times. When Paola and Martín meet each other, there is a hatred between them that later becomes love, despite the interest that Martín feels Paola's friend (Vanessa Del Moral, the daughter of the owner of the track where Paola works as a waitress where she skates at).

Noticing the interest that Martin and Paola have, Vanessa tries to destroy the relationship (getting angry with Paola, whom she becomes her hated rival). Even when he learns that there is a skating team on the track in which Paola participates, Vanessa registers in order to compete against her old friend. Paola and Vanessa become the two contestants of the team to compete against a foreign team in a large test exhibition. During the development of the event, when Vanessa and Paola are the ones that skate, the first one causes the second one to suffer a serious accident, throwing it against the windows around the track. The entire public is shocked by the event that takes place, especially Julián Ledezma, and Paola's family. She is transferred to the hospital immediately. The expectations of walking again are very difficult, the doctors report to the Armendares family. However, despite all the initial prognoses, and after several treatments and an operation, Paola starts walking again.

Meanwhile, Vanessa goes on tour with Martin. However, due to the constant jealous attacks of his partner, and other details, Martin asks Vanessa away from the group, who can not stand. All takes place normally during the following weeks.

Vanessa begins to show symptoms of illness that worry her mother. She sends some analysis to her daughter, and through them, it is confirmed that her daughter suffers from cancer, and that she only has very little time left to live. Heartbroken, Vanessa's mother asks to see Martin, to whom she tells her daughter's illness. The young man is shocked. The mother also asks him to marry his daughter to make Vanessa happy moments before leaving. Martín hesitates to accept, but when Vanessa faints before him and Paola, the singer decides to accept. Visit Vanessa and ask her for marriage. Vanessa accepts.

The future marriage is in the public domain. Paola can not help feeling bad about the situation, but she accepts it willingly. The day of the wedding arrives, and before the event begins, Vanessa begins to feel bad. The bride is moved to her home, where all the guests are waiting (Paola and Vanessa talk in the room). The tragic moment finally arrives. Vanessa dies in the midst of her parents' tears and the commotion of Martín, Paola and their respective relatives, who were going to attend the wedding.

After Vanessa is buried, Paola and Martín resume their relationship. But Martin's conflicts with his manager get bigger, and the young man decides to confront him. This causes Martín to be unjustly taken to jail. Paola, desperate, requests the help of Julián Ledezma, who agrees to take Martin out of jail. Paola agrees, as a thank you, to marry him. Martin is liberated, while his former manager is taken to jail.

Meanwhile, the relationship between Elisa and Gonzalo (who had divorced his wife) begins to crack. Jealousy invades Gonzalo when a new suitor from Elisa (César) appears. But later everything is composed, and Elisa and Gonzalo again resume their love.

Martín looks for Paola. However, she is already married to Julian, and she also tells him that she does not love him anymore. Gonzalo advises his son to forget forever about Paola. Given this, the young man decides to go on tour abroad, because he has nothing left to stop that. Martín and his group go on tour, reaching spectacular success and rising to the category of recognized artists.

Gonzalo, happy of his son's success, decides to postpone his relationship with Elisa for a while to go see his son. But the plane in which he travels fails, having fatal consequences for the passengers. With this, the life of Gonzalo ends and the love between him and Elisa.

They spend time. The marriage between Julian and Paola faces some problems. Elisa and her family get involved in a boarding school, where new stories emerge. The obstacles for Paola and her family continue, but in the end, happiness ends up triumphing.

Cast
 
Angélica María as Elisa Morán Vda. de Armendares
Alberto Vázquez as Gonzalo Dávila
Pedro Armendáriz, Jr. as Aarón Zamora
Natalia Esperón as Paola Armendares
Flavio César as Martín Dávila
Alexis Ayala as Julián Ledezma
María Teresa Rivas as Elvira Armendares
Angélica Aragón as Bertha
Gabriela Hassel as Vanessa del Moral
César Évora as Esteban Armendares
Carlos Bracho as Jorge Bosch
Julissa as Lola
Liliana Weimer as Patricia Dávila
David Ostrosky as Víctor Manuel Medina
Eduardo Liñán as Alonso del Moral
Pedro Weber "Chatanuga" as Nicolás Dávila
Anel as Rebeca del Moral
José María Torre as Daniel Armendares
Marisol Centeno as Anita Armendares
Felipe Colombo as Luisito Dávila
Irán Castillo as Cecilia Zamora
Ofelia Guilmáin as Bárbara
Enrique Guzmán as César
Roxana Chávez as Irma Zamora
Eulalio González "Piporro" as Antonio Rozas
Humberto Elizondo as Tomás
Oscar Servin as Bruno
Monserrat Ontiveros as Avelina "Lina" Gómez Calderón
Diego Schoening as Tavo
Sergio de Bustamante as Gino
Marisol Mijares as Renata Zamora
Alan Gutiérrez as Jerónimo
Sergio Blass as Cristián
Nora Salinas as Jessica
Charlie as Félix
Francesca Guillén as Deborah/Fernanda Gómez Calderón
Silvia Campos as Marcela
Karla Álvarez as Isabel
Ariane Pellicer as Lara Lai
Shanti Clasing as Marisol
Sherlyn as Clarita
Alejandra Peniche as Gloria Gómez Calderón
Sergio Acosta as Ismael Pérez
Eduardo Arroyuelo as Rubén
Alejandro Ibarra as Aldo
Sergio Ochoa as Fernando
Adriana Acosta as Adriana
Kelly as Kelly
Sheyla Tadeo as Sheyla
Edith Márquez as Edith del Castillo
Leonardo Daniel as Miguel Davis
Isaac Edid as Rafa
Regina Torné as Mercedes Bosch
Alfredo Alegría as Lenguardo
Eugenio Bartilotti as Silver
Diego Sieres as Memo
Lourdes Reyes as Laura
Manuel Landeta as Arnold
Giorgio Palacios as del Prado
Claudia Vega as Dínorah
Luis Gimeno as Lucio
José Carlos Ruiz as Odilón
Jorge Russek as Pompeyo
Patricio Castillo as Serafín
Manuel Gurría as Coque
Sandra Olivares as Lorena
Vaitiare Bandera as Vilma Montemayor
Raúl Meraz as Julián's father
Juan Carlos Colombo as Dr. Belazcuarán
Martha Aguayo as herself
Saúl Lisazo as Martín's lawyer
Fernando Borges as Chauffeur
Cecilia Toussaint
Irlanda Mora
Arleth Terán
Anna Silvetti
Eduardo Schillinsky
Yadira Santana
Marcela Pezet
Guillermo Murray
Lourdes Munguía
Miguel Pizarro
Toño Infante
Charo
Laureano Brizuela
Jacqueline Voltaire
Héctor Sandarti
Zoila Quiñones
Shanik Berman

Soundtrack

Disc 1: Agujetas de color de rosa

"Agujetas de color de rosa" – Curvas Peligrosas (Main theme)
"Inolvidable" – Flavio César
"En tus manos" – Angélica María
"Mi oración" – Alberto Vázquez
"La vida es rosa" – Irán Castillo
"Al filo de lo prohibido" – Alan Gutiérrez
"Tengo tantos novios" – Marisol Mijares
"Amigo de bolsillo" – Marisol Centeno
"Me tienes que prometer" – Gabriela Torrero
"Superprendido" – Chicos del Boulevard
"Siempre estarás en mí" – Irán Castillo & José María Torre
"Cruce de sonrisas" – José María Torre

Disc 2: Más agujetas de color de rosa

"Mi chico prohibido" – Curvas Peligrosas
"Mi novio volvió" – Irán Castillo
"Voy, voy, voy" – Onda Vaselina
"Cuchi fever" – Charo
"Energía" – Microchips
"Corazón" – Stephanie Salas
"Tatuaje" – Gabriela Torrero
"Vueltas" – Sentido Contrario
"Superstar" – Marisol Centeno
"Somos la luz del mañana" – Sergio Blass
"Oyendo tu voz" – Microchips
"Qué tienen tus besos" – Angélica María
"Agujetas de color de rosa (Bacalao Mix)" – Curvas Peligrosas

Awards

References

External links

1994 telenovelas
Mexican telenovelas
1994 Mexican television series debuts
1995 Mexican television series endings
Spanish-language telenovelas
Television shows set in Mexico
Televisa telenovelas